Frans de Hulst (1610, Haarlem – 1661, Haarlem), was a Dutch Golden Age painter.

Biography
According to the RKD he was a pupil of Pieter Mulier I and became a member of the Haarlem Guild of St. Luke in 1631. He is known for beach scenes and landscapes in the manner of Salomon van Ruysdael and Jan van Goyen.

References

Frans de Hulst on Artnet

Weblinks 

1610 births
1661 deaths
Dutch Golden Age painters
Dutch male painters
Dutch landscape painters
Artists from Haarlem
Painters from Haarlem